Protula bispiralis, commonly known as the red fanworm or as a mopworm, is a species of marine polychaete worm in the family Serpulidae.

Description
Red fanworms have bodies which grow to 65mm in a tube of up to 10mm in diameter. They are lovely fanworms, having a white shell-like tube and two bright orange-red spirals of feathery branches protruding from it.

Distribution
These animals are found off the southern African coast from Cape Point to Durban, subtidally and to at least 25m.

Ecology
These animals grow under boulders or crevices, and are often seen on vertical rock faces. They use their feeding crowns to catch microplankton.

Synonyms
The following species are synonyms of Protula bispiralis:
Protula (Philippiprotula) magnifica Straughan, 1967 (subjective synonym)
Protula magnifica Straughan, 1967 (subjective synonym)
Serpula (Spiramella) bispiralis Savigny, 1822 (objective synonym)
Serpula bispiralis Savigny, 1822 (objective synonym)
Spiramella bispiralis (Savigny, 1822) (objective synonym)

References

Serpulidae
Animals described in 1822
Taxa named by Marie Jules César Savigny